Christella puberula, synonym Thelypteris puberula, is a species of fern known by the common name showy maiden fern. The variety Ch. puberula var. sonorensis is known by the common name Sonoran maiden fern.

It is native to southwestern North America and Central America, from the foothills and deserts of California and Arizona south through Mexico to Costa Rica. It grows in canyons, streambanks, and seeps in several types of habitat.

Description
Christella puberula produces a number of regularly shaped, equally spaced green leaves with numerous long, flat, lance-shaped leaflets. One leaf may exceed 1.5 meters in length, and the thick leaflets may be over 20 centimeters long. The undersides of the leaflets are hairy, especially on the indusia covering the spore-bearing sori.

References

External links

Jepson Manual Treatment: Thelypteris puberula var. sonorensis
Flora of North America
Thelypteris puberula - U.C. Photo gallery

Thelypteridaceae
Ferns of the United States
Ferns of California
Flora of Central America
Flora of Mexico
Flora of Northwestern Mexico
Flora of Arizona
Flora of Costa Rica
Flora of Sonora
Flora of California
Natural history of the California chaparral and woodlands
Natural history of the Santa Monica Mountains
Natural history of the Transverse Ranges